Chelsea Brandwood is a Canadian curler from St. Catharines, Ontario. She currently skips a team on the World Curling Tour. Her hometown is Beamsville, Ontario.

Career

Youth
Brandwood's first provincial title came at the women's bantam championship in 2012.

Brandwood won the Ontario Junior women's championship in 2015, with teammates Claire Greenlees, Brenda Holloway and Danielle Greenlees. The team represented Ontario at the 2015 Canadian Junior Curling Championships. Brandwood led her rink to a 7-3 record, after the round robin tournament. In the playoffs, she beat British Columbia's Corryn Brown team, before losing in the final to Alberta's Kelsey Rocque.

In university curling, Brandwood played for the Laurier Golden Hawks, where she won three straight provincial (OUA) titles from 2014 to 2016, but came up short in 2017, her fourth year of eligibility. She was the alternate for the Laurier team (skipped by Carly Howard) at the 2014 CIS/CCA Curling Championships, where they finished third. At the 2015 CIS/CCA Curling Championships, she was the lead on the team, and won another bronze medal. At the 2016 CIS/CCA Curling Championships, she was the skip of the team, but they missed the playoffs.

Brandwood then attended Niagara College, skipping their women's team to a provincial college title in 2018. She represented Niagara at the 2018 CCAA Curling National Championships, where she led her team to a 4-3 record.

Women's
Brandwood won her first World Curling Tour event at the 2018 Gord Carroll Curling Classic, defeating Korea's Gim Un-chi in the final. Later that season, Brandwood qualified for her first provincial women's championship, the 2019 Ontario Scotties Tournament of Hearts. In 2020, her team competed at the 2020 Ontario Scotties Tournament of Hearts where they finished in dead last with a 1-7 record.

In 2022, Brandwood won the Home Again Curling Classic bonspiel, and qualified for the 2023 Ontario Scotties Tournament of Hearts, where they went 1–4.

References

External links

Living people
Canadian women curlers
Curlers from Ontario
Sportspeople from St. Catharines
Wilfrid Laurier University alumni
Year of birth missing (living people)
21st-century Canadian women